USNS Gordon (T-AKR-296) is a Gordon-class roll on roll off vehicle cargo ship of the United States Navy. She was originally built as a merchant vessel but later acquired and converted by the Navy, and assigned to the United States Department of Defense's Military Sealift Command. Gordon was built in Denmark in 1972 as MV Jutlandia, and entered commercial service on 1 June 1973. After some time spent in commercial service she was lengthened by Hyundai Heavy Industries in 1984, and later went on to be acquired by the US Navy under a long term charter. She was converted to a US Navy Vehicle Roll-on/Roll-off Ship at Newport News Shipbuilding and Drydock Company and on delivery to the Navy was assigned to the Military Sealift Command on 23 August 1996 under the name USNS Gordon, after Medal of Honor recipient Master Sergeant Gary Gordon. Gordon is one of 28 Strategic Sealift Ships operated by the Military Sealift Command. She is assigned to the MSC Atlantic surge force and is maintained at Canton, Baltimore, Maryland in Reduced Operational Status 4, meaning she can be on her way to pick up cargo within 4 days of notification.

References

Gordon-class vehicle cargo ships
Auxiliary ships of the United States
1972 ships
Ships built by Hyundai Heavy Industries Group